Grevillea pulchella, commonly known as beautiful grevillea, is a species of flowering plant in the family Proteaceae and is endemic to the southwest of Western Australia. It is a spreading shrub usually with pinnatisect leaves, and cylindrical clusters of white to cream-coloured flowers.

Description
The edges of the leaves are turned down or rolled under, the lower surface usually with a few soft hairs.

Taxonomy
This species was first formally described in 1810 by Robert Brown who gave it the name Anadenia pulchella in Transactions of the Linnean Society of London. In 1845, Carl Meissner changed the name to Grevillea pulchella in Johann Georg Christian Lehmann's Plantae Preissianae. The specific epithet (pulchella) means "beautiful and small".

Distribution and habitat
Beautiful grevillea grows in variety of soils, on laterite or granite and occurs from Busselton to Manjimup and Albany, in the Stirling Range, and from the Helena River to Narrogin in the south-west of Western Australia.

References

pulchella
Endemic flora of Western Australia
Eudicots of Western Australia
Proteales of Australia
Taxa named by Robert Brown (botanist, born 1773)
Plants described in 1810